Vojislav Đonović (November 18, 1921 – January 5, 2008), nicknamed Vojkan, was a famous Serbian jazz guitarist - soloist, member of the Belgrade Jazz Trio and Jazz Orchestra of the Radio Belgrade. He was also a composer and  arranger.

Vojislav Đonović was born on November 18, 1921 in Belgrade, where he spent most of his life. His father, a Serbian diplomat, bought his first guitar in the 1930s. Đonović claimed it was the best guitar he ever owned. After a year of learning, he began playing in the streets of Belgrade. In 1951, Vojislav Đonović joined the Jazz Orchestra of Radio Belgrade. He participated as a composer, soloist, and an arranger. From 1959 - 1962, Vojislav Đonović gained a lot of popularity as a soloist in the Grand Revue Orchestra Elijah Backa Genić. In addition to jazz,  Đonović also enjoyed folk music and romantic genres. Later,  Đonović moved his main focus to music production. Đonović died in Belgrade on January 5, 2008.

References

1921 births
2008 deaths
Serbian jazz guitarists
Yugoslav musicians
20th-century guitarists